For the waterfalls of the same name see Jog Falls

Jog is a village located in Shivamogga district of Karnataka state, India. The Jog Falls is near this village.

Demographics
 India census, Jog Falls had a population of 12,570. Males constitute 51% of the population and females 49%. Jog Falls has an average literacy rate of 74%, higher than the national average of 59.5%: male literacy is 81%, and female literacy is 68%. In Jog Falls, 11% of the population is under 6 years of age.

References

Cities and towns in Shimoga district